Reason is the third album by Officium Triste, released in 2004 by Displeased Records.

Track listing
  "In Pouring Rain" – 5:42  
  "The Silent Witness" – 8:43  
  "This Inner Twist" – 8:18  
  "The Sun Doesn't Shine Anymore" – 10:35  
  "A Flower in Decay" – 8:43

Personnel
 Pim Blankenstein – vocals
 Johan Kwakernaak – rhythm guitar
 Martin Kwakernaak – drums, keyboards
 Gerard de Jong – lead guitar
 Lawrence Meyer – bass guitar

References 

Officium Triste albums
2004 albums